The Golden Seals are a Canadian indie rock band formed in 1999 in London, Ontario and now based in Ottawa, Ontario, Canada. The band is led by singer and songwriter Dave Merritt and his long-time collaborator Philip Shaw Bova. Past members and contributors have included Matt Ouimet, Steve Boudreau, Michael Bonnell, Jeremy Gara (Arcade Fire), Jordon Zadorozny (Blinker the Star), Andy Magoffin (Two-Minute Miracles) and John Higney.

History
The Golden Seals formed in 1999, after Merritt and Bonnell's prior bands, Adam West and The Buffalo Brothers, broke up. The two originally collaborated on a song for the Rheostatics album The Story of Harmelodia, "Song of the Garden", and then began working on the first Golden Seals album, Storybook Endings, which was released in 2001. Their second album, 2002's No-Hitter, appeared on local community radio charts.

The band released two EPs on the Zunior label. They also contributed a cover of Rheostatics' "Loving Arms" to the 2007 Rheostatics tribute album The Secret Sessions.

The Golden Seals did not record another full-length album until 2011, when their power-pop album Increase the Sweetness was released, to positive reviews and substantial radio play on CBC.

Discography
Storybook Endings (2001)
No-Hitter (2002)
Business Casual (2005, EP)
Wetsuit (2006, EP)
Increase the Sweetness (2011)
Stay Golden (2014, mostly covers)
Something Isn't Happening (2019)

See also

Music of Canada
Canadian rock
List of Canadian musicians
List of bands from Canada
:Category:Canadian musical groups

References

External links
The Golden Seals

Musical groups established in 1999
Canadian indie rock groups
Musical groups from Ottawa
1999 establishments in Ontario